Boy Culture is a 2006 American romantic drama film directed by Q. Allan Brocka, based on the 1995 novel of the same name by Matthew Rettenmund. The film stars Derek Magyar, Darryl Stephens, Patrick Bauchau, Jonathon Trent, and Emily Brooke Hands.

Plot
A successful escort describes in a series of confessions his entangled romantic relationships with his two roommates and an older, enigmatic client.

The story remains the same as the novel, about a man who goes by only the letter "X" to maintain his anonymity and relationships between his two roommates—one of whom he's in love with—and an enigmatic older client who challenges him to find his heart before he will consent to sex.

The film's differences from the novel include Andrew's character (now an African-American) and the location of the story in Seattle, Washington, instead of Chicago, Illinois.

Cast

 Derek Magyar as Alex "X"
 Darryl Stephens as Andrew
 Patrick Bauchau as Gregory Talbot
 Chris Bethards as young Gregory
 Jonathon Trent as Joey
 Emily Brooke Hands as Lucy
 George Jonson as Blondie
 Kyle Santler as Scooter
 Matt Riedy as Frank
 Clifford Harrington as Renaldo
 Joshua Boswell as young Renaldo
 Peyton Hinson as Jill
 Demene Hall as Zelma
 William Hall, Jr. as Oren
 Molly Manago as Cheyenne
 Laprell Nelson as Matthew
 Q. Allan Brocka as Bruce Lee

Production
Boy Culture is based on a novel, with a few important differences found between the two. It was decided in the film to set it in Seattle rather than Chicago, and to make substantial differences to the character of Andrew, including his ethnicity. The film is also noted for the careful eye of the director, who managed to turn what was an 18-day production cycle into a fully realized film.

Soundtrack

Release
The film made its world premiere in the United Kingdom at the London Lesbian and Gay Film Festival (since renamed BFI Flare: London LGBT Film Festival), on April 1, 2006, and made its debut in the United States at the Tribeca Film Festival on April 26, 2006. It subsequently received a very limited theatrical release in the United States on March 23, 2007.

Film festival circuit
Boy Culture was shown at the following film festivals:
 2006 London Lesbian and Gay Film Festival - April 1, 2006
 2006 Tribeca Film Festival - April 26, 2006
 2006 Seattle Film Festival - May 25, 2006
 2006 Atlantic Film Festival - September 15, 2006
 2006 Verzaubert Queer Film Festival - November 14, 2006
 2006 Paris Gay and Lesbian Film Festival - November 19, 2006
 2007 Cleveland International Film Festival - March 16, 2007
 2007 Philly Film Festival - April 6, 2007
 2007 Mostra Internacional de Cinema Gay i Lèsbic de Barcelona - July 7, 2007

Reception

Critical response
Boy Culture currently holds a 71% rating on Rotten Tomatoes based on 31 reviews; the consensus states: "Eloquent one-liners and quick pacing make Boy Culture sharper than the typical gay indie flick." On Metacritic, based on 12 critics, the film has a 56/100 rating, signifying "mixed or average reviews". Maitland McDonagh from TV Guide wrote, "Shrewder than you'd think and not half as dumb as it looks." Jeannette Catsoulis from The New York Times wrote, "A slick and absorbing drama." Ronnie Scheib from Variety wrote, "A strong cast, formal visual style and cynical voiceover that propels the action help elevate this Seattle-set gay romp from the ranks of the stereotypical."

Awards

Home media
The film was released on DVD on August 14, 2007, courtesy of TLA Video. The release includes an audio commentary from writer/director Q. Allan Brocka and writing partner Philip Pierce, interviews with Brocka and the four stars, deleted scenes, premiere footage from the Tribeca Film Festival and the film's trailer.

Boy Culture:The Series
In 2017, a Kickstarter campaign was launched for "Boy Culture: The Series" an episodic sequel to the original, which proposed to star Matthew Wilkas (X), Darryl Stephens (Andrew), Matthew Crawford (Chayce), as well as Stephen Guarino and singer Steve Grand. The campaign met its funding goal and the series was filmed in August 2018. It was also announced that Derek Magyar, who played the lead role "X" in the original film, is now reprising his role, taking over for Matthew Wilkas, who was originally announced to be replacing him.

In June 2021, Magyar announced that the series will be seen publicly before the end of the year.

On August 3, 2021, The Kickstarter was updated to include the date of the 1st public viewing to be 21st Annual San Diego LGBTQ Film Festival! on September 11, 2021, at the Museum of Photographic Arts (MOPA) at Balboa Park.

References

External links
 
 
 
 

2006 films
2006 independent films
2006 LGBT-related films
2006 romantic drama films
American independent films
American LGBT-related films
American romantic drama films
2000s English-language films
Films about interracial romance
Films about male prostitution in the United States
Films based on American novels
Films set in Seattle
Films shot in Washington (state)
Films shot in Seattle
Gay-related films
LGBT-related romantic drama films
2000s American films